Favorite son (or favorite daughter) is a political term.

 At the quadrennial American national political party conventions, a state delegation sometimes nominates a candidate from the state, or less often from the state's region, who is not a viable candidate in the view of other delegations, and votes for this candidate in the initial ballot. The technique allows state leaders to negotiate with leading candidates in exchange for the delegation's support in subsequent ballots. The technique was widely used in the 19th and early 20th centuries. Since nationwide campaigns by candidates and binding primary elections have replaced brokered conventions, the technique has fallen out of use, as party rule changes in the early 1970s required candidates to have nominations from more than one state.
 A politician whose electoral appeal derives from their native state, rather than their political views is called a "favorite son". For example, in the United States, a presidential candidate will usually win the support of their home state(s).
 Especially in parliamentary systems, a "favorite son" is a party member to whom the party leadership is likely to assign a prominent role, for example, Paul Martin while Jean Chrétien was the Prime Minister of Canada, or Gordon Brown while Tony Blair was the Prime Minister of the United Kingdom.

See also
 List of major-party United States presidential candidates who lost their home state
 Home state advantage

References

Bibliography
 
 
 
 
 

Political terminology of the United States
Political terminology
Political concepts
Political people